A god of war is a deity associated with war.

God of War or Gods of War may also refer to:

Books 
 The Gods of War, a 1985 novel by historical author John Toland
 The Gods of War, a 2005 novel by Conn Iggulden and the fourth in the Emperor series
 The God of War, a 2008 novel by Marisa Silver
 Gods of War, a 2009 science fiction novel by Ashok Banker
 God of War (DC Comics), a 2010–2011 limited six-issue comic book series published by WildStorm and DC Comics, based around the Greek era of the video game series
 God of War, a 2010 novelization of the 2005 video game, God of War, written by Matthew Stover and Robert E. Vardeman
 God of War II, a 2013 novelization of the 2007 video game, God of War II, written by Robert E. Vardeman
 God of War – The Official Novelization, a 2018 novelization of the 2018 video game, God of War, written by James Barlog
 God of War (Dark Horse Comics), a 2018–2021 limited two-volume eight-issue comic book series published by Dark Horse Comics, based around the Norse era of the video game series

Film and television 
 God of War (South Korean TV series), a 2012 television series about military leader Kim Jun
 God of War (film), a 2017 Chinese historic war action film
 God of War (upcoming TV series), an adaptation of the video game series, currently in development

Video games 
 God of War (franchise), an action-adventure video game series 
 God of War (2005 video game), a video game for the PlayStation 2 and the first in the series
 God of War II, a 2007 video game for the PlayStation 2
 God of War: Betrayal, a 2007 video game for mobile phones
 God of War: Chains of Olympus, a 2008 video game for the PlayStation Portable
 God of War Collection, a 2009 reissue of God of War and God of War II, remastered for the PlayStation 3; ported to the PlayStation Vita in 2014
 God of War III, a 2010 video game for the PlayStation 3
 God of War: Ghost of Sparta, a 2010 video game for the PlayStation Portable
 God of War: Origins Collection, a 2011 reissue of Chains of Olympus and Ghost of Sparta, remastered for the PlayStation 3
 God of War Saga, a 2012 collection featuring God of War Collection, Origins Collection, and God of War III for the PlayStation 3
 God of War: Ascension, a 2013 video game for the PlayStation 3
 God of War III Remastered, a 2015 reissue of God of War III, remastered for the PlayStation 4
 God of War: A Call from the Wilds, a 2018 text-based game played via Facebook Messenger
 God of War (2018 video game), a video game for the PlayStation 4 and Windows
 God of War Ragnarök, a 2022 video game for the PlayStation 4 and PlayStation 5

Music

Albums 
 Gods of War (Blasphemy album), a 1993 album by black metal band Blasphemy
 Gods of War (Manowar album), a 2007 album by heavy metal band Manowar
 God of War: Blood & Metal, a 2010 EP of heavy metal music inspired by the God of War video game series

Songs 
 "Gods of War" (song), a 1987 song by rock band Def Leppard
 "God of War", a song by Derek Sherinian
 "God of War", a song by the Faeroese band Týr

See also 
 War Gods (disambiguation)
 Lord of War